A bookmark manager is any software program or feature designed to store, organize, and display web bookmarks. The bookmarks feature included in each major web browser is a rudimentary bookmark manager. More capable bookmark managers are available online as web apps, mobile apps, or browser extensions, and may display bookmarks as text links or graphical tiles (often depicting icons). Social bookmarking websites are bookmark managers.  Start page browser extensions, new tab page browser extensions, and some browser start pages, also have bookmark presentation and organization features, which are typically tile-based. Some more general programs, such as certain note taking apps, have bookmark management functionality built-in.

See also 

 Bookmark destinations
 Deep links
 Home pages

 Types of bookmark management 
 Enterprise bookmarking
 Comparison of enterprise bookmarking platforms
 Social bookmarking
 List of social bookmarking websites

 Other weblink-based systems
 Search engine
 Comparison of search engines with social bookmarking systems
 Search engine results page
 Web directory
 Lists of websites

Software engineering